David Oppenheim may refer to:

David Oppenheim (clarinetist) (1922–2007), American clarinetist and producer
David Oppenheim (poker player) (born 1973), American poker player
David Oppenheim (rabbi) (1664–1736), chief rabbi of Prague
Dave Oppenheim, founder of Opcode Systems